Balwant Singh Bhauryal (born on 15 August 1960 ) - is an Indian politician belonging to the Bharatiya Janata Party.Now he is second time member of 4th uttarakhand legislative assembly (2017-2021) elected from kapkot constituency of Bageshwar district.
Bhauryal was also a member of 2rd Uttarakhand  Legislative assembly. elected  from  Kapkot  Bageshwar, Uttarakhand Legislative Assembly in India &
State chief electoral officer.

He was elected from Kanda  (Vidhan Sabha constituency) in the 2007 to 2012.  He has served as Cabinet Minister of Uttarakhand from 2009  to 2012. given the charge of the Minister for Health,  Secretariat  Administration and Medical Education along with Information  Technology. Bhauryal also became the Guardian minister for Nanital  district.

Early political career 
Balwant Singh Bhauryal  made his foray into politics in 1975 when he was elected as member of Gram Panchayat and then district general Secretary in year 1997.  
     
Thereafter, he was elected Zilla Panchayat  President  of  Bageshwar district  uttarakhand from 1998 to 2002
Bhauryal has been President of the Bharatiya Janata Party (BJP) Bageshwar District, department coordinator, and State coordinator of Bharatiya Janata Party from 2003 to 2007

From 2012 to 2015 he was given charge of District in-charge of Pithoragarh District. In 2015 Balwant Singh Bhauryal was Head of BJP Sadasyata Abhiyan Pramukh of Uttarakhand State

References

http://indianexpress.com/article/india/regional/nishank-expands-team-retains-khanduris-men-in-cabinet/

External links 
 Official website
 http://indianexpress.com/article/india/regional/nishank-expands-team-retains-khanduris-men-in-cabinet/

People from Bageshwar district
Bharatiya Janata Party politicians from Uttarakhand
Members of the Uttarakhand Legislative Assembly
Living people
1960 births
People from Bageshwar
Uttarakhand MLAs 2017–2022